Dauberville is a census-designated place in Centre Township, Berks County, Pennsylvania, United States.  It is located near the Schuylkill River near the Ontelaunee Township border.  Students living in the town attend the Schuylkill Valley School District.  The community is located within the Reading, PA Metropolitan Statistical Area, and is a more distant town within the Philadelphia CMSA.  As of the 2010 census, the population was 848 residents.

Demographics

See also
Dauberville Bridge, a historic concrete arch bridge spanning the Schuylkill River

References

Populated places in Berks County, Pennsylvania
Populated places on the Schuylkill River